The New South Wales Board or New South Wales GAA is a division of the Australasian Gaelic Athletic Association (GAA), and is responsible for Gaelic games in New South Wales, Australia. The board is also responsible for the New South Wales state team.

The board contains clubs from Sydney and Wollongong, playing Gaelic football, hurling and camogie. The games are played at Monarch Oval in Ingleburn.

Gaelic football clubs 
Bondi Gaels
Young Ireland Sydney
Michael Cusacks
Penrith Gaels
Cormac McAnallan's
Wollongong Leprachauns
Clan na Gael

Hurling clubs 
Michael Cusack's
St Pat's
Shamrocks
Central Coast
Cormac McAnallan's

Women's Gaelic football clubs 
Clan na Gael
Michael Cusack's
Central Coast
Cormac McAnallan's (formerly Irish Aussies)

See also

External links 

New South Wales GAA site

Australasia GAA
Gaelic games governing bodies in Australia
GAA
Irish-Australian culture
1963 establishments in Australia
Sports organizations established in 1963